St Stephen's Church, Westbourne Park, is a Grade II listed parish church in the Church of England in London.

History

St Stephen's Church dates from 1856. It was designed by the architect brothers Frederick John and Horace Francis, who designed at least 20 other churches around London – only St Stephen's is believed to still be in existence. Many changes have been made to the church over the years, the most notable being the removal of a tall spire. The latter was removed following World War II when it was deemed unsafe.

The church, both exterior and interior, appears in the 1954 Adelphi feature film The Crowded Day.

Vicars

 Richard Dryer (current)

Organ

The organ dates from 1866 by William Hill. There have been subsequent modifications by Hill, Norman and Beard. A specification of the organ can be found on the National Pipe Organ Register.

References

Churches completed in 1856
Church of England church buildings in the City of Westminster
Grade II listed churches in the City of Westminster
Diocese of London
Holy Trinity Brompton plants